The Nokia 4.2 is a Nokia-branded entry-level smartphone developed by HMD Global, running the Android operating system, which was released on 14 May 2019.

Overview 
It features 5.71" 19:9 720x1520 pixels IPS LCD display, an octa-core Qualcomm Snapdragon 439 (12 nm) chipset, a dual-camera 13MP + 2MP setup on the back along with wide-angle 8 MP front camera. The camera of the Nokia 4.2 uses phase detection auto-focus. It comes with a 3,000 mAh battery, which is non-removable.

The Nokia 4.2 has a large screen and thin bezels with a dewdrop notch. The phone has a chin on the bottom with the Nokia logo.

RAM/Storage 
The phone comes with two types of models:

 2GB RAM variant with 16 GB e-MMC 5.1 secondary memory.
 3GB RAM variant with 32 GB e-MMC 5.1 secondary memory.

They both support up to 400 GB external memory card.

Sensors and inputs 
It has Micro USB (USB 2.0) port, Ambient light sensor, Proximity sensor, Accelerometer and rear-mounted fingerprint sensor.

Software 
The Nokia 4.2 runs on Android 9.0 "Pie". As with all other Nokia phone models, the Nokia 4.2 is part of the Android One program.

Reception 
The Nokia 4.2 won a Good Design Award 2019

References

External links 
 Official Nokia 4.2 website

4.2
Mobile phones introduced in 2019
Mobile phones with multiple rear cameras